Asha Ali (born 7 June 1980) is a Somali-Swedish singer-songwriter. She specializes in indie pop.

Career
Ali started her career in 2005, when she released her first record Warm Fronts EP.

In 2006, her debut album Asha Ali was issued. Her follow-up album Hurricane arrived in 2009.

Ali has also worked with Brothers Lindgren on children's music.

Albums
Warm Fronts EP (2005)
Asha Ali (2006)
Hurricane (2009)
Loud and Out of Place (2014)

References

Asha Ali's official website

External links
INTERVJU: ASHA ALI
Asha Ali
Asha Ali CD

Living people
1980 births
Swedish pop musicians
Swedish songwriters
21st-century Swedish singers
Ethiopian emigrants to Sweden